Reissha Nicole Villar Magadia  (born July 17, 1998), professionally known as Nicole Villar, is a Filipino print-commercial model and beauty pageant title holder who was crowned Miss Teen Philippines 2014 on May 31, 2014, and represented her country in Miss Teen International 2016 held in Jacksonville, Florida, United States, where she finished first runner-up.

Early life and education 
Reissha Nicole Villar was born in Antipolo, Rizal. She graduated valedictorian in elementary and high school.  She also represented her school in various competitions, including the 11th National Science Quest hosted by the Department of Education in Baguio City, where she emerged champion in extemporaneous speaking.

She graduated from Ateneo de Manila University with a degree in legal management, with a minor in international business and is currently pursuing a Juris Doctor degree at Ateneo Law School.

Family 
Nicole Villar is from a family of lawyers and businessmen. She is the niece of former Senate president and business tycoon Manuel "Manny" Villar. She is also the grand daughter of the late Hon. Judge Arturo Villar.

Career 
Villar is a professional model, beauty queen and entrepreneur. She is also the founding president of YETE Foundation, Inc. an organization dedicated on volunteerism, education and youth empowerment. At age 14, she was part of Palmolive Circle of Ten where she did a TV commercial with Janella Salvador. She is also a part of Creamsilk-Candy's 30 Beyond Beautiful Ambassadors and Candy Fair 2014. She was also featured in Philippine Daily Inquirer as an endorser for Happy Skin Cosmetics with an article written by Miss Universe 2015 Pia Alonzo Wurtzbach.

Villar is a Philippine delegate to the National Youth Commission's South East Asian Youth Programme (SEAYP) .

She appeared in TV shows like Good Morning Club, a morning show in TV5 for an interview and featured in PTV4's  Lakbayin Ang Magandang Pilipinas as a recipient of Sangguniang Bayan Award of Angono, Rizal. She also graced the podcast of The Jing Monis Show as a guest and title holder. As a proud Rizaleño, she promoted woman empowerment during her reign. In an article from Manila Bulletin by Mayor Jun Ynares, she was described to have "the aura of the Rizal province. Young. Beautiful. Determined."

Pageantry

Miss Teen Philippines 2014 
Villar, aged 15, was crowned 2014 Miss Teen Philippines held  at the Philippine International Convention Center in Pasay. She was recognized by her clever response to the question: “What’s the best advice you’ve learned from your mother?”. She received  P2.6 million worth of prizes, including a college scholarship package and Sun Cellular products.“The best advice I’ve learned from my mom is woman empowerment,” Magadia said, before she was proclaimed the first Miss Teen Philippines  in seven years. She was also the recipient of the Sun Cellular People’s Choice Award after getting the most number of text votes in the competition. With her victory, Magadia becomes the Department of Education youth ambassador tasked to promote the value of education among the youth nationwide. Magadia also represented the Philippines in several global youth conferences, including the Southeast Asian Youth Program and the National Youth Parliament. As a role model for the youth, Magadia said: “I plan to inspire the youth by embodying those values in all my actions, my deeds, and my thoughts and I guess the best way to inspire them is being the change they want to see."

Miss Teen International 2016 
Villar represented the Philippines in Miss Teen International  held on July 30, 2016 in The Times-Union Center for the Performing Arts, Jacksonville, Florida, United States. She competed with teenaged girls from America and other regions in the world. She finished first runner-up amongst 40 candidates.

References 

Filipino beauty pageant winners
Living people
1993 births
Filipino female models
People from Antipolo
Ateneo de Manila University alumni